ConFest is an alternative bush campout festival held in the south-eastern states of Australia annually during and around Easter. The name 'ConFest' is a concatenation of the words Conference and Festival. ConFest was initiated in 1976, and organised by the former Deputy Prime Minister of Australia, Dr. Jim Cairns, his private secretary Junie Morosi and David Ditchburn. It was and is intended to bring together the various subcultures of the alternative movement, and was billed as "An Exploration of Alternatives".

The event has been run almost continuously by the same cooperative society; The Down To Earth Co-op (DTE), based in Victoria. ConFest now hosts some 7000 participants annually for a 5-day festival over the Australia's Easter long weekend. The current ConFest Site is located to the West of Deniliquin and about 12 km from Moulamein in New South Wales. The area is open forest with the Edward River running along the southern side of the property.

Features
Confest is typically divided up in to a number of discrete "villages" situated along a tree-lined river. These villages host a number of themed "spaces" where participants host workshops that are listed on an open agenda board displayed centrally in the festival. Workshops typically include yoga, meditation, permaculture, arts, music, and sexuality. However, many of the spaces are open to a range of eclectic and diverse topics. Villages also host shared kitchen spaces where communal cooking and food sharing is encouraged. The extensive Arts Village hosts many of the festivals major gathering points.

Villages surround a central open paddock which hosts a food and arts marketplace. This marketplace is the only location within the festival where money is used. It also hosts a number of activities such as a spontaneous choir and informal fashion parade. Surrounding the marketplace is a dedicated area for Fire Twirling, an information tent where participants can find out about the various villages and workshops, and a silent disco space.

Villages and notable spaces (Easter Confest 2019)

History
The first ConFest was held in 1976 on a property at Cotter River near Canberra in the Australian Capital Territory. It was initiated and organised by the former Deputy Prime Minister of Australia, Dr. Jim Cairns, his private secretary Junie Morosi and David Ditchburn.

In the early days, the organising committee rented space from various property owners, normally on or near the Murray River. However, due to dramatically increased insurance costs, it became increasingly difficult to locate suitable locations, until in the early years of the 21st century a property became available for purchase.

Event Timeline

Climate
The property used for the March 2019 Confest gathering was one of two owned by the Down to Earth Cooperatives for the purpose of holding Confest gatherings. This region generally has a warmer climate over Summer and Autumn, and a cooler climate over Winter relative to Melbourne where the highest proportion of event participants reside. The Summer Confest was cancelled and was not held for several years while fire mitigation work was carried out on the property. The Autumn Confest held over the Easter long weekend has continued while this has taken place. It is often referred to as "Easter Confest" due to its timing but is a non-denominational event with participants able to observe their own spiritual practices including candle lighting at designated events and spaces as long as there is no fire ban. In 2016 an additional Confest was organised for Spring. It was unable to go ahead due to flooding.

Legal issues

In 2015 police reported that 38 of 54 people searched on the approach road to the event were found in possession of illicit substances.

There have been a number of assaults throughout the festival's history by a few individuals, including sexual assaults during massages and an attempted child abduction. In some cases, this has resulted in lifetime bans from the festival and police involvement.

References

External links

 
 Down to Earth Co-op website

1976 establishments in Australia
DIY culture
Festivals in Australia
Clothing-optional events
Recurring events established in 1976